Sexi Mong is a South Korean four-part drama that was aired on Channel CGV in 2007. It is about three private investigators who fight sex crimes.

Cast
 Kim Ji-woo as Kwon Dong-eun
 Kang Eun-bi as Kang Han-na
 Seo Young as Oh Seon-jung
 Dokgo Joon as Wang Soo-chul
 Kim Tae-hoon as Yoon Jae-yi
 Jung Ye-ri
 Kim Sun-young

References

External links
 

2007 South Korean television series debuts
2007 South Korean television series endings
Korean-language television shows
South Korean crime television series
Channel CGV television dramas